The Cyber-Enhanced Working Dog (CEWD) is a four-pound dog harness that is wrapped around a work force dog, such as a search and rescue dog. In its current status, the apparatus is a prototype developed by computer tech researchers at North Carolina State University and it provides nearly 100 ways to communicate with a dog wearing one, through vibrations produced by the harness and voice commands sent through speakers.

The harness could help future dog search and rescues, it can detect for gas leaks and it is also equipped with microphones and cameras to help assist in rescues; it has an eight-hour battery life. The apparatus can also detect the dog's stress level, which is considered both an important factor to establish how much to prolong a search and rescue, as well as something that can shorten the dog's life. To work with a Cyber-Enhanced Working Dogs, it is necessary for the dogs to be specifically trained.

References

External links
 Official press release

Dog training and behavior